Canningstown is a village in northeastern County Cavan, Ireland.

History
The area was originally known as New Bridge, but was renamed by Lord Garvagh around 1850, after his surname Canning to Canningstown.

See also
List of towns and villages in Ireland

References

Towns and villages in County Cavan